Judith Nancy Yates  (20 November 1943 – 20 May 2022) was an Australian housing economist. She was a lecturer and associate professor at the University of Sydney from 1971 to 2009. As a social liberal economist, she published over 120 papers in academic journals and government and industry reports on most aspects of Australia's housing sector, most notably on distributional aspects of the tax and finance system, on affordability and the supply of low-rent housing.Throughout her career she was appointed to a number of government advisory committees, and she contributed to many government inquiries.

She was the first woman on the boards of the Commonwealth Bank and the Housing Loans Insurance Corporation. From 2001 to 2017 she worked extensively with the Australian Housing and Urban Research Institute (AHURI).

Early life 
Judith Yates née Potter was the eldest of five children. Her father Vernon Wheatley Potter married Betty Bates of Port Pirie in South Australia in 1942, while he was serving in the Royal Australian Air Force. Her mother Betty was university–educated and a teacher. After the War, Vernon Potter obtained a medical degree and was surgical registrar in Broken Hill NSW from 1945, before taking up practice in the mining port of Port Pirie in May 1949.  Yates attended school in Port Pirie, where she showed a strong aptitude for mathematics.

Yates obtained a cadetship from the Commonwealth Bureau of Census and Statistics (now the Australian Bureau of Statistics ABS) to study economics at the Australian National University (ANU), and was among the first intake at the new residential college, Bruce Hall. She topped her class in her Honours degree in 1964. When she found her male fellow cadets would be paid more than she would, she paid off her bond and never worked for ABS, taking up a tutorship in Economics at ANU instead, then a lectureship at the University of Adelaide during 1966. She married Warren Yates at the end of that year. The couple lived for three years in the Netherlands while Warren worked as an electrical engineer in Philips. They both became fluent in Dutch and retained lifelong connections and friendships in the Netherlands, visiting regularly and taking bicycling tours in Europe. Yates did a PhD at University of Amsterdam, on control theory and stability of systems of equations. She published a paper from her thesis in 1967, but it would be 14 years before she published in economics again.

The couple returned to Australia in 1971 and settled in Mosman on Sydney’s North Shore. Warren obtained a lecturer position at the then NSW Institute of Technology, eventually becoming Professor and head of department, while Judith was offered a lectureship in mathematical economics in the School of Economics at the University of Sydney. They had two children, Kylie in 1971 and Mark in 1972.

From 1975 to 1981, Yates was active in economics education, through the NSW Board of Secondary School Studies and the Higher Education Research and Development Society of Australia.

On her first sabbatical to Britain in 1979, Yates became embedded in the housing research community. No other Australian academics were involved in housing research at the time.

Career in housing economics

Deregulation and distribution 
Around 1980, Yates was one of many economists commissioned for background work by the Australian Financial System Inquiry (Campbell Report), which sought as part of financial deregulation to bring housing interest rates in line with market rates. With her strong sense of social justice, Yates turned her attention to distributional issues, which few others were considering at the time. She did much of the distributional work for the Inquiry.

Using several surveys, Yates estimated the distribution of wealth and housing demand in Australia for the first time. She formed the strong opinion that indirect subsidies to home owners, specifically the non-taxation of imputed rent and breaks on land tax, were inequitable and inefficient as it gave the greatest benefit to wealthier households who had already paid off their houses, neither helping first home buyers nor increasing supply.

In 1984, because of her work on housing finance, she was invited as the first woman to join the boards of the Housing Loans Insurance Corporation and, the Commonwealth Bank. She was also seconded to the National Inquiry into Local Government Finance.

It had been presumed that deregulation would result in more finance for housing, which would increase home ownership, and would encourage banks to be more innovative. In a 1988 review, Yates showed that after an initial spurt from 1982 to 1985, deregulation barely changed the real value of housing loans in Australia. The extra money made available disappeared into higher house prices. As well, the private sector remained conservative and unadventurous, while the public sector was setting up innovative secondary mortgage markets and low-start loan instruments. 

Her last paper on deregulation was published in 2016. She considered deregulation had allowed strong economic performance and prosperity in Australia. However, income and wealth inequality increased, while the credit boom and the vastly expanded securitisation market caused a tripling of debt. There were perverse distributional outcomes, as house prices rose dramatically, housing supply was inadequate, and access to affordable housing decreased.

Housing subsidies 
In 1987, with Joe Flood, she produced the Housing Subsidy Study. The project report detailed several hundred housing subsidies, distributing them by housing tenure and income group, to show that high income home owners were receiving the greatest subsidies, while private renters were receiving almost nothing. The results were instrumental to the Commonwealth greatly extending Rent Assistance to private renters. Today, this is by far Australia’s largest housing assistance programme, with annual outlays of over $5 billion.

The same year, Yates proposed a radical restructuring of housing assistance not just in Australia but generally, through an ingenious self-financing insurance scheme which included her four preferred interventions. These were a tax on imputed income from owner-occupied housing, a housing allowance, shared equity loans and housing bonds. The scheme involved a considerable redistribution of benefits from rich to poor.

Yates continued to evaluate housing subsidies throughout her career, providing updates to distribution estimates in 2003, 2004 and 2010.

In 2020, the New South Wales government announced a plan to give purchasers a choice between stamp duty on purchase and a land tax, in line with recommendations of Yates and other economists. Yates commented this would be an extremely slow process.

Shared equity 
High interest rates in the 1980's distorted and “front loaded” the standard credit foncier mortgage, In a 1983 Working Paper, Yates discussed incentives for the introduction of Shared Appreciation Mortgages, a form of shared equity loan. At first she stated a non-subsidised program could only benefit people who could already afford to buy, but later she found a way for this to work.

In subsequent years, she engaged in comparative work on shared equity with Christine Whitehead. After 2000, the issue was not inflation but  very high and rapidly increasing house prices. Interest grew among government and non-profit lenders to use shared equity in stretching available funds for lending to lower income households, but the idea never really became popular with either lenders or borrowers.

Private finance for social housing 
A huge shortfall in affordable and social rental housing had developed in Australia by 1991, with governments unwilling to construct stock at the necessary scale. As part of the 1991 Housing Strategy, Yates suggested a synthetic “equity bond” backed by a stock of rental housing, similar to a unit trust, to attract money for affordable housing from the rapidly expanding superannuation industry. This made front-page news, when it was announced the Victorian government and senior Commonwealth public servants supported the plan. However, it was not adopted.

After 2012, Yates worked with other researchers to advance vehicles for attracting private finance.

Housing choices 
In 1996 Yates and AHURI researcher Maryann Wulff obtained a three-year Australian Research Council grant, Australia’s Housing Choices, the outcomes of which were published in a book and in a special journal issue. The collaborative study looked at the impacts of the very substantial social and economic restructuring that had been taking place in Australia, including falling fertility, labour market restructuring and rent assistance. From the analysis, three important new strands of research emerged - falling home ownership, loss of low-cost rental housing, and distributional impacts of urban restructuring.

Falling home ownership 
The Housing Choices study identified for the first time that the home ownership rate for younger households, which had been thought to be stable since the early 1960s, was falling. The details were laid out in Yates’ first study under the newly reconstituted Australian Housing and Urban Research Institute (AHURI). The incidence of ownership had fallen by nine percentage points over the period 1981-96 for 25-34 year-olds, and five points for 35-44 year-olds.

In subsequent decades, the incidence of home ownership among young people continued to decline slowly. In a land of home owners, the subject was of great interest to the press. In 2015, Yates found ownership had declined by 16 points for 25-34 year-olds and a decline was becoming evident in middle-aged households.

Low-cost rental housing 
With social housing declining and incomes polarising, the demand and supply of private rental housing rapidly increased, but low-rent properties disappeared. The need for low-rent stock doubled between 1986 and 1996. Low-income renters were paying a much higher proportion of their incomes than had previously been deemed acceptable. Wulff and Yates found that more than half the remaining affordable stock was occupied by higher-income young couples who were competing with low income older single persons. To explain the situation, they variously considered two-income households saving to buy, property managers screening out low-income tenants, and misdirection of supply-side incentives. They concluded, "The unaided private market provision of new low-income housing is substantially a fantasy."

The shortfall of affordable rental dwellings subsequently grew very rapidly, reaching 271,000 by 2011. In 2015, with AHURI researcher Kath Hulse, she examined the apparent paradox where increasing demand from higher and lower income households was accompanied by increasing concentration of supply in mid-market segments. The authors attributed the mid-market misallocation to an increasing reliance on capital gains by landlords, accompanied by taxation benefits and urban consolidation pressure.

Housing affordability 
As the Director of AHURI Sydney from 2001 to 2004, Yates obtained her largest research project in 2003, involving seven other researchers across Australia. She wrote the final report in 2007 with Vivienne Milligan. This was Yates’ major contribution to mainstream housing research and to the study of the Australian housing system. She found that 860,000 lower income households in Australia were paying more than 30% of their incomes on housing. About a quarter of these reported financial stress. Of the tenures, lower income private renters had more intense, widespread and persistent problems, with about half of these lacking secure, affordable housing, with little hope of home ownership. Median Sydney house prices needed to be at least $150,000 lower to be affordable.

Some of the risks associated with housing affordability problems were borne by society:

 Frequent moves contributed to a lack of social cohesion
 Intergenerational equity was compromised by lack of access to home ownership. The necessary real income to purchase a median-priced house had more than doubled since 1984.
 Higher-income households who could no longer afford ownership were pushing lower-income renters out of the affordable private stock.
 Gentrification was pushing affordable housing to the city fringe, causing difficulties in recruiting labour.
 The sensitivity of at-risk households to interest rate rises made it more difficult to manage the economy.

The necessary responses were:

 The long-term trend of rising land and house prices needed to be dampened by reducing impediments to housing supply and reforming tax settings.
 There would be a continuing need to provide direct assistance to help lower-income renters and assist aspirant and struggling buyers.
 A framework for long-term renting was needed to attract institutional investment and boost the capacity of regulated landlords.

Turbulent times 
In 2011 following the Global Financial Crisis in which house lending had been heavily implicated in the US recession, Yates offered three broad analyses of the housing sector and housing policy in Australia. For the Reserve Bank’s decadal review she stated that the housing system was unstable due to structural problems, and it was too late to return to an era of affordable housing and high home ownership. In a second paper with Mike Berry, she sketched out the implications for housing of two post- crisis scenarios of business as usual and recession. In a third paper, she questioned whether maintaining home ownership as the dominant tenure was sustainable on an intergenerational basis.

Wealth inequality 
Yates returned intermittently to the question of wealth distribution and imputed rental. In 1991, with the assistance of an ABS fellowship, she analysed methodologies and data sources for including imputed rent within income distributions, in line with United Nations recommendations.

in 2009 she put her own mark on the prevalent research topic of the effect of perceived wealth on household spending. She found $100,000 in extra wealth increased spending by $1000 to $1500 annually. This implied that a 5% increase in housing wealth would increase GDP by 0.2 to 0.3 per cent. Middle-aged home owners were the most likely to increase consumption.

In 2012 Yates gave the Giblin lecture at the University of Tasmania, explaining why wealth inequality was important. She showed that the near-doubling of wealth per household in Australia over the decade after 1996 was almost entirely due to price increases of housing.  Attitudes among home owners regarding their inalienable right to accumulate unearned gains needed to change, and socially generated wealth should be retained by the community. She considered that a land tax constructed as a resource tax, and repayment on sale of First Home Owner Grants, were desirable steps.

In a chapter for a book on Australia's cities in the same year, Yates concentrated on spatial variations in housing wealth, and particularly on debt, She found that increased competition under liberalisation lowered interest rates, financial innovations such as redraw and interest only loans reduced borrower risk, and borrowers without children became eligible for larger loans - reversing the traditional advantage of home purchasers with children in obtaining housing finance.

Housing policy overview 
As Australia's leading housing economist, Yates was frequently asked to give overview articles or addresses on the state of housing policy. In 1994 she criticised the beginnings of the housing boom, stating, "The new army of low paid workers in insecure jobs with casually employed spouse and the tribe of impoverished people in their twenties have little chance of entering the housing market, ever...A boom is disastrous for first home buyers and useless to most home owners trading places." She described the decade as a watershed for housing policy, when government opened the country to market forces, passing on many risks to individuals whereas previously risks had been pooled and borne by society. The government had withdrawn from supporting public housing while contributing a massive amount of Rent Assistance paid to low-income private renters. No demands were made on owners. Thus, governments essentially abandoned traditional Australian values of a “fair go for all”.

Later years 
Yates retired from teaching in 2009, but maintained a full programme of research. She was appointed a Member of the Order of Australia Award in 2021 for "significant services to housing research and education”. The Judith Yates Prize in Economics was announced at the University of Sydney soon afterward for an undergraduate essay “meeting societal needs”.

In 2020 she produced her first book, describing endlessly rising house and land prices in Australia as a "massive policy failure and a great betrayal".

Judy Yates died in May 2022 from a progressive lung condition. At her memorial, she was designated as the “doyenne of Australian housing researchers”. Colleagues described her dignified common sense, her easy-going calmness accompanied by intellectual restlessness, her legendary organisation, and her unstoppable and tireless commitment to social justice. She was rooted entirely in the present, neither aspirational nor dwelling on past glories or mistakes. She was much more interested in what people had to say than who they were, and listened attentively to anyone.

Yates was intellectually uncompromising and bold, never adjusting her principles or ideals to meet the changing political climate. For more than forty years, she worked almost exclusively on Australian housing markets. She supported exactly the same social liberal policy solutions throughout her forty year career, which were to:

 Increase the supply of social rental housing and affordable private rental housing
 Target housing subsidies equitably to lower income earners and between tenures
 Apply a broad-based land tax as a resource rent
 Increase rent assistance.

Boards and advisory committees 
 Housing Loans Insurance Corporation 1984-1987
 Commonwealth Banking Corporation 1984-1990
 Australian Housing Council (1987–91
 Building Research and Development Advisory Committee 1987-90
 Ministerial Advisory Committee on Housing Access (1989–91)
 NSW Home Purchase Assistance Authority 1993-2001
 Australian Statistics Advisory Council 1994-97
 Resource Cooperative Housing 1990-92
 NSW Ministerial Task Force on Affordable Housing 1998
 National Housing Company Ltd 2011-2012
 National Housing Supply Council 2008-2013
 Editorial and Management Board, Housing Studies (UK) journal, 1992-2007.

Background papers 
 Australian Financial System Inquiry (1981)
 Committee of Inquiry into Local Government Financing (1984)
 Social Security Review (1987)
 National Housing Policy Review (1989)
 Economic Planning and Advisory Council (1991)
 National Housing Strategy (1991)
 Committee for the Economic Development of Australia (2017)

Awards 

 Recognition of achievement for housing research award (2008)
 Member of Order of Australia (2021)

Publications

Books 

 Australia's Housing Choices (1999). With Maryann Wulff. 
 Housing Policy in Australia, A Case for System Reform (2020) with Pawson and Milligan

Selection of academic papers 

 A note on the conditions for stability of a set of equations (1967) 
 The demand for owner-occupied housing.(1981).
 Deregulation of interest rates for housing? (1981)
 Equalisation and cash limits: a view from down under (1987
 Housing finance and deregulation: predictions and outcomes (1988)
 Housing subsidies and income distribution (1989) with Joe Flood
 Housing policy reform: a constructive critique (1989)
 Imputed rent and income distribution (1994)
 Towards a reassessment of the private rental market  (1996)
 Is Australia's home-ownership rate really stable? an examination of change between 1975 and 1994 (2000)
 W(h)ither low cost private rental housing? (2000) with Maryann Wulff
 Housing implications of social, spatial and structural change (2002)
 The more things change?' An overview of Australia's recent home ownership policies (2003)
 Affordable rental housing: lost, stolen and strayed (2005) with Gavin Wood
 Market provision of affordable rental housing: lessons from recent trends in Australia (2005) with Maryann Wulff
 Whitehead, C. and Yates, J. (2007) Increasing affordability problems - a role for shared equity products? Experience in Australia and the UK (2007) with Christine Whitehead
 Australia's housing affordability crisis (2008)
 Home ownership as a (crumbling) fourth pillar of social insurance in Australia. (2010) with Bruce Bradbury
 Evaluating social and affordable housing reform in Australia: lessons to be learned from history (2013)
 Why does Australia have an affordable housing problem and what can be done about it? (2016)
 A private rental sector paradox: unpacking the effects of urban restructuring on housing market dynamics. (2017) with Kath Hulse

Selection of commissioned reports 

 The distributional Impact of interest rate regulation on the household sector (1981, Campbell Report)
 Housing subsidies study (1987, AHRC) with Flood
 Low rent housing in Australia 1986 to 1996: How has it changed (2001, AHRF) with Wulff
 Housing implications of social, spatial and structural change (2002, AHURI)
 A distributional analysis of the impact of indirect housing assistance (2003, AHURI)
 Changes in the supply of and need for low rent dwellings in the private rental market (2004, AHURI) with Wulff and Reynolds
 Housing affordability: a 21st century problem (2007, AHURI) with Milligan
 Sustaining fair shares: the Australian housing system and intergenerational sustainability. (2008, AHURI) with Kendig, Phillips, Milligan and Tanton.
 Housing wealth and consumer spending (2009, AHURI) with Whelan
 Supply shortages and affordability outcomes in the private rental sector: short and longer term trends (2015, AHURI) with Hulse, Reynolds and Stone.
 Housing prices, household debt and household consumption (2017, AHURI) with Atalay and Whelan
 CHIA NSW. Social and affordable housing projections, 2016–26

References 

1943 births
2022 deaths
Australian economists
Academic staff of the University of Sydney
Australian National University alumni
University of Amsterdam alumni
Members of the Order of Australia